Oren Pinhassi is an Israeli sculptor who lives and works in New York City. Pinhassi is known for an approach to sculpting which creates a liminality between monuments and mundane objects. He often incorporates household objects, such as toothbrushes or plastic furniture coverings, paired with large scale work made from stone, sand, and bronze. His 2021 exhibition with Helena Anrather was titled Lone and Level, a line from Percy Bysshe Shelley's poem Ozymandias.

Early life and education
Pinhassi was born in Tel Aviv in 1985. He received a B.Ed.F.A. from Hamidrasha School of Art, Beit-Berl College in 2011, and a MFA from Yale University of Art in 2014.

Career
Through his sculptural work, Pinhassi deals with queer spaces. Veronica Esposito describes this in The Guardian "as areas where things don’t sit exactly right, where individuals can become porous and vulnerable in ways that aren’t possible in heteronormative spaces." He also addresses notions of vulnerability and mourning as central themes in his work.

Selected Group and solo Exhibitions 
In 2018, Pinhassi had an exhibition at Skibum MacArthur in Los Angeles. In 2019 Pinhassi was selected alongside Felipe Baeza, Julia Bland and Arghavan Khosravi in an exhibition curated by Doron Langberg at Yossi Milo Gallery in New York City. In 2021 he had his exhibition Lone and Level at Helena Anrather in New York, Thirst Trap at Commonwealth and Council in Los Angeles. In 2018, 2021 and 2022 he exhibited in the UK with Edel Assanti Gallery in London.  The gallery went on to exhibit a solo presentation of Pinhassi's work at Art Basel Miami Beach 2022.

Awards and Residencies 
In 2019 Pinhassi received a Pollock Krasner Foundation Grant.

References 

Israeli sculptors
1985 births
Living people
Gay sculptors
Israeli contemporary artists
Yale School of Art alumni
Israeli emigrants to the United States
21st-century Israeli sculptors
Israeli gay artists
Israeli LGBT sculptors